Blaster Master: Blasting Again (known as Blaster Master in Japan) is the fifth video game in the Blaster Master series. It was released for the PlayStation. The release of the original game had a different plot, but this title is a follow-up to the Worlds of Power adaptation in all regions. It was released in Japan on July 13, 2000, and was supposed to be released in North America on November 7, but issues with the game caused it to be delayed until it got a release on May 6, 2001.

Gameplay
Blaster Master: Blasting Again is a third-person 3D platformer that puts the player at the controls of the high-tech, all-terrain combat vehicle SOPHIA J-7. The player navigates through several areas of caverns to uncover and ultimately stop the treacherous plans of a mysterious alien race of Lightning Beings. On some occasions the player's character must exit SOPHIA and go solo through alien complexes. As the game progresses, the player will earn upgrades for SOPHIA, and be able to salvage weapon upgrades for the pilot. The player views cut-scenes that convey the key elements in the story. The character will fight a boss at the end of each stage.

The player's character is Roddy, a sixteen-year-old boy at the helm of an all-terrain combat vehicle, SOPHIA. The player pilots SOPHIA through a labyrinth of 3D rooms in search of clues to the enemy's movements. Occasionally the player will encounter enemy installations or limiting topography that will force Roddy to leave Sophia, and advance on foot. As the game progresses, new equipment will be made available for SOPHIA, allowing access to new areas.

Plot
In Blaster Master, Jason first encountered the Lightning Beings and their leader at the time, the Plutonium Boss. With the help of Eve and Sophia 3rd, the Plutonium Boss' plans were eliminated. However, the threat of the Lightning Beings continued and Jason spent the next many years defeating them time and time again. Eventually, in between missions and prowling the underground keeping monsters at bay, Jason and Eve formed a family with their two children, Roddy and Elfie.

It was a sad day when Eve died. Several years later, Jason met an untimely death at the hands of Lightning Beings. Five years after the death of Eve, the Earth is plagued by geological phenomenon. Having rebuilt Sophia 4th into Sophia J-7 (to honor the name of their father, Jason), Roddy and Elfie take up the mantle of Earth's protectors at a very young age.

A suspicious bout of activity from the Lightning Beings prompts Roddy and Elfie to investigate. As Roddy takes Sophia underground to battle his foes, he learns that someone has resurrected the power of the Plutonium Boss and that the sequences of events are connected to the alien heritage of the siblings' mother.

Ironically, the vast majority of the backstory of Blasting Again isn't present in any of the previous games and is instead found in the novelization.

Development
Although the game is a sequel to the original Blaster Master for the NES, the writers of Blasting Again used elements from the Worlds of Power novelization of Blaster Master in the game's storyline. Particularly, the character of Eve, an original character from the novel who was not in the NES game, was introduced in Blasting Again as the wife of Jason and the mother of Roddy and Elfie. The novel's author, Peter Lerangis, felt "honored" for the privilege.

Reception

The game received "average" reviews according to the review aggregation website GameRankings.

References

External links

 

2000 video games
Action video games
PlayStation (console) games
PlayStation (console)-only games
Sunsoft games
Video games developed in Japan
Single-player video games
Crave Entertainment games
Blaster Master